Twig Rock is a small rocky mass, more than 90 m high, between Alamode Island and Hayrick Island in the Terra Firma Islands, off the west coast of Graham Land.

Discovery
The Terra Firma Islands were first visited and surveyed in 1936 by the British Graham Land Expedition (BGLE) under Rymill. Twig Rock was surveyed in 1948 by the Falkland Islands Dependencies Survey (FIDS), who so named it because of the branching nature of the dike system exposed on its north face.

See also
Graham Land

References

External links

Rock formations of Graham Land
Fallières Coast